The 1969–70 Honduran Liga Nacional season was the 5th edition of the Honduran Liga Nacional.  The format of the tournament remained the same as the previous season.  Club Deportivo Olimpia won the title and qualified to the 1970 CONCACAF Champions' Cup.

1969–70 teams

 Atlético Indio (Tegucigalpa)
 C.D. España (San Pedro Sula)
 Lempira F.C. (La Lima, promoted)
 C.D. Marathón (San Pedro Sula)
 C.D. Motagua (Tegucigalpa)
 C.D. Olimpia (Tegucigalpa)
 C.D. Platense (Puerto Cortés)
 C.D. Progreso (El Progreso)
 C.D. Victoria (La Ceiba)
 C.D.S. Vida (La Ceiba)

Regular season

Standings

Top scorer
  Flavio Ortega (Marathón) with 18 goals

Squads

Trivia
 Marathón made 57 goals this season, a record that is still intact.
 Honduras changed its name to Progreso.

Known results

Round 1

Round 2

Round 3

Round 4

Round 5

Round 6

Round 7

Round 8

Round 9

Round 10

Round 11

Round 12

Round 13

Round 14

Round 15

Round 16

Round 17

Round 18

Round 19

Round 20

Round 21

Round 22

Round 23

Round 24

Round 25

Round 26

Round 27

Unknown rounds

References

Liga Nacional de Fútbol Profesional de Honduras seasons
1
Honduras